Geelong railway station is located on the Warrnambool line in Victoria, Australia. It serves the city of Geelong, and it opened on 1 November 1856.

Together with Ballarat, it is one of only two stations in Victoria to have a 19th-century train shed, and is listed on the Victorian Heritage Register. The railway station complex has also been listed by the National Trust of Australia, as being of state-level significance.

History

Geelong station was built as the terminus of the Geelong and Melbourne Railway Company line. It was a dead-end terminus, located on the site of the present law courts complex. In November 1876, the railway was extended south to Winchelsea, necessitating the relocation of the station to the west, and between 1877 and 1881, the current station building was constructed.

In 1975, the station received a minor upgrade to the refreshment rooms, and was also provided with a waiting room around this time. In 1988, the station received an upgrade, and included new passenger waiting areas and booking offices.

Until the 1990s, there was a goods yard, including a large goods shed, located on the eastern side of the station. It is now the site of Geelong's law courts and police station. A locomotive depot remains to the north, and carriage stabling sidings are to the west.

In March 2015, a further upgrade to the station was completed, which included the installation of a new DDA-compliant pedestrian overpass to connect all platforms, which included lifts, avoiding the need to use the original heritage-protected pedestrian bridge, which only has stairs.

Platforms and services

Geelong has one island platform with two faces, and one side platform. Prior to the opening of the Regional Rail Link in 2015, almost all trains used Platform 1. Platforms 2 and 3 were only used when Platform 1 was occupied;

Platform 1: Up services to Southern Cross and Down services to South Geelong, Marshall, and Waurn Ponds.

Platform 2: Up and Down Warrnambool services, terminating services and other services if Platform 1 was occupied.

Platform 3: Terminating services, special heritage services and other services if Platform 1 was occupied.

After the opening of the Regional Rail Link, Geelong now has three times as many services running, requiring trains to cross at Geelong on a regular basis. The platforms have now been divided into Up and Down platforms;

Platform 1: Down services to South Geelong, Marshall, Waurn Ponds, and Warrnambool

Platform 2: Up services when Platform 3 is occupied, special heritage services

Platform 3: Up services to Southern Cross, terminating services

It is common for a trains to be in all three platforms e.g.

Platform 1: Down Waurn Ponds service

Platform 2: Up service, stopping all stations

Platform 3: Up express service from Warrnambool

It is serviced by V/Line Geelong and Warrnambool line services. Some services terminate at Geelong, although most continue south.

Platform 1:
 services to South Geelong, Marshall, Waurn Ponds and Southern Cross
 services to Warrnambool and Southern Cross

Platform 2:
 services from South Geelong, Marshall and Waurn Ponds to Southern Cross
 services from Warrnambool to Southern Cross

Platform 3:
 services from South Geelong, Marshall and Waurn Ponds to Southern Cross
 services from Warrnambool to Southern Cross; Peak hour terminating services

Transport links

CDC Geelong operates seven routes via Geelong station, under contract to Public Transport Victoria:
: North Shore station – Deakin University Waurn Ponds Campus
: Geelong – Bannockburn
: to Corio Shopping Centre
: to North Shore station
: to North Geelong station
: to Bell Post Hill
: to Deakin University Waurn Ponds Campus

McHarry's Buslines operates twelve routes via Geelong station, under contract to Public Transport Victoria:
: to Whittington
: to St Albans Park
: to Leopold
: to Deakin University Waurn Ponds Campus
: to Deakin University Waurn Ponds Campus
: to Deakin University Waurn Ponds Campus
: to Jan Juc
: to Jan Juc
: to Ocean Grove
: to Queenscliff
: to St Leonards
: to Drysdale

V/Line operates road coach services from Geelong station to Apollo Bay, Ballarat, Colac and Warrnambool.

References

External links

Victorian Railway Stations gallery

Railway stations in Australia opened in 1881
Listed railway stations in Australia
Railway stations in Geelong
Regional railway stations in Victoria (Australia)
Heritage-listed buildings in Greater Geelong